Jill Tasker (born September 13, 1964) is an American retired actress. Tasker had starred as "Lou Malino" for nine episodes of the 1995-96 season, of The WB's, The Wayans Bros. She also appeared in guest roles on The Days and Nights of Molly Dodd, Law & Order, American Playhouse and other shows. She starred with Joan Collins in the 1992 Broadway production of Private Lives, playing the role of Sybil. Tasker earned a J.D. degree in 2004 and currently works as a voiceover artist and personal coach. She is married to actor Doug Stender and resides in New York City. HAVE A GOOD DAY.

External links

1964 births
Living people
Actresses from Boston
People from New York City
American voice actresses
American television actresses
20th-century American actresses
21st-century American women